The Forgotten Story is a British historical drama television series which was first broadcast on ITV in 1983. It is an adaptation of the 1945 novel of the same title by Winston Graham.

In the 1890s a young American boy is sent to live with his relatives on the Cornish coast near Falmouth.

Cast
 Sarah-Jane Bickerton as  Fanny (6 episodes)
 Van Johnson as Perry (6 episodes)
 Lila Kaye as Madge (6 episodes) 
 Alexis Woutas as  Anthony (6 episodes)
 Angharad Rees as  Patricia (5 episodes)
 Jonathan Kent as  Tom Harris (4 episodes)
 George Camiller as  Ned (3 episodes)
 Phillip Manikum as  Policeman (3 episodes) 
 John Stratton as  Joe Veal (3 episodes)
 Elizabeth Ashley as  Jenny Veal (1 episode) 
 Robert Blythe as  Martin (1 episode)
 Norman Bowler as Ship's officer (1 episode)
 Robert Brown as Captain Stevens (1 episode)
 Robert Cartland as  O'Brien (1 episode)
 Chris Colyer as Bert (1 episode)
 Peter Copley as Mr. Cowdray (1 episode)
 Val Lorraine as Maid (1 episode)
 Richard Mathews as Dr. Penrose (1 episode)
 Peter McQueen as Ted (1 episode)
 Julia Moody as Girl singer (1 episode) 
 Alan Penn as Purvis (1 episode)
 Betty Tucker as Mrs. Cooley (1 episode)
 Hubert Tucker as Rev. Cooley (1 episode)
 Norman Tyrrell as  Harbourmaster (1 episode)
 Jerold Wells as  Lamplighter (1 episode)

References

Bibliography
Ellen Baskin. Serials on British Television, 1950-1994. Scolar Press, 1996.

External links
 

ITV television dramas
1983 British television series debuts
1983 British television series endings
1980s British drama television series
English-language television shows
Television shows produced by Harlech Television (HTV)
Television shows set in Cornwall
Television shows based on British novels